Ensina is a genus of the family Tephritidae, better known as fruit flies.

Species
Ensina azorica Frey, 1945
Ensina brevior (Hennig, 1940)
Ensina decisa Wollaston, 1858
Ensina longiceps (Hendel, 1914)
Ensina sonchi (Linnaeus, 1767)

References

Tephritinae
Tephritidae genera
Diptera of Asia
Diptera of Africa
Diptera of Europe
Diptera of South America